The 1965–66 Serie C was the twenty-eighth edition of Serie C, the third highest league in the Italian football league system.

Girone A

Girone B

Girone C

References and sources
Almanacco Illustrato del Calcio – La Storia 1898–2004, Panini Edizioni, Modena, September 2005

Serie C seasons
3
Italy